Geraz do Minho is a Portuguese Freguesia in the municipality of Póvoa de Lanhoso, it has an area of 4.33 km² and 521 inhabitants (2011). It has a population density of 120 people per km².

Population

References 

Freguesias of Póvoa de Lanhoso